Cossulus intractatus is a moth in the family Cossidae. It is found in Afghanistan, Uzbekistan, Tajikistan, Kirghizistan, and Turkmenistan.

References

Natural History Museum Lepidoptera generic names catalog

Cossinae
Moths described in 1887
Moths of Asia